Pacifia goddardi is a species of sea slug, an aeolid nudibranch, a marine gastropod mollusc in the family Unidentiidae. This species was recently discovered by Jeff Goddard, and named by his friend, Terry Gosliner. It was found while searching for another species in Carpinteria State Beach in Santa Barbara, California.

Description
The body is translucent white, with mature specimens being approximately 33 mm long. It has smooth rhinophores, with orange-tipped, subapical red bands on the cerata.

It produces eggs in a long, convoluted ribbon, which hatch into planktotrophic veliger larvae.

Distribution
Pacifia goddardi was described from the intertidal zone of Carpinteria State Beach, California. It has also been found at 9 m depth in Las Flores Canyon, off Malibu, at 18 m depth on the south side of West Anacapa Island and at 9 m depth off Point Dume, Malibu, California.

References

Unidentiidae
Gastropods described in 2010